Pavlo Andriiovych Bakunets  is a Ukrainian politician and a People's Deputy of the 9th Ukrainian Verkhovna Rada.

Biography
Pavlo Andriiovych Bakunets was born on July 10, 1987, in Yavoriv, Lviv Oblast, Ukraine. He received a BA from the Ukrainian Catholic University in Lviv, also attended UCU's Lviv Business School, and graduated from the University of Lviv. 

Bakunets became a representative on the local council of Yavoriv, and was on the ethics committee. From 2014 to 2015, he was the secretary of Yavoriv Municipality, and in 2015, he was elected mayor of Yavoriv, a position he held until 2019. He was the leader of the Yavoriv branch of the Self Reliance political party, and is the cofounder of Youth of Yavoriv Raion, an NGO.

Parliamentary Activity
On August 29, 2019, Bakunets became a Member of Ukrainian Parliament. In the 2019 Ukrainian parliamentary election, he was elected in Ukraine's 122nd electoral district and received 14.84% of the vote, a plurality.

Although elected a member of Self Reliance (the only Self Reliance MP elected in 2019), he joined the Trust parliamentary group once in the Verkhovna Rada, a move which was opposed by Self Reliance leader Oksana Syroyid.

In the Verkhovna Rada, he holds a number of positions. Bakunets is a member of the Verkhovna Rada Committee on Law and Political Affairs. Beyond that, he is:
 The deputy of the group of interparliament connections with the Republic of Cuba 
 A member of interparliament connections with the Republic of Poland.
 A member of interparliament connections with the United States.

Electoral history

2019 Ukrainian parliamentary election

References

External links
 Official Facebook page

1987 births
Living people
People from Yavoriv
Ukrainian Catholic University alumni
University of Lviv alumni
Mayors of places in Ukraine
Ninth convocation members of the Verkhovna Rada
Self Reliance (political party) politicians
21st-century Ukrainian politicians